Nilson Barbosa Nascimento Júnior (born 9 September 1991) is a Brazilian professional footballer who plays as a defender for Iranian club Sepahan in Persian Gulf Pro League.

Club career

Sepahan
On 5 August 2022, Nilson signed a two-year contract with Iranian Persian Gulf Pro League side Sepahan.

Career statistics

Club

References

1991 births
Living people
Brazilian footballers
Persian Gulf Pro League players
Vila Nova Futebol Clube players
Sepahan S.C. footballers
Brazilian expatriate footballers
Expatriate footballers in Portugal
Brazilian expatriate sportspeople in Portugal
Expatriate footballers in Iran
Brazilian expatriate sportspeople in Iran
Association football defenders
Campeonato Brasileiro Série B players
Campeonato Brasileiro Série C players
Campeonato Brasileiro Série D players